Christian, Count of Stolberg-Stolberg (15 October 1748 – 18 January 1821) poet, brother of Frederick Leopold, also a poet.

Born at Hamburg, he became a magistrate at Tremsbüttel in Holstein in 1777. Of the two brothers Frederick was undoubtedly the more talented. Christian though not a poet of high originality, excelled in the utterance of gentle sentiment.

They published together a volume of poems, Gedichte (edited by H. C. Boie, 1779); Schauspiele mit Chören (1787), their object in the latter work being to revive a love for the Greek drama; and a collection of patriotic poems Vaterländische Gedichte (1815).

Christian of Stolberg was the sole author of Gedichte aus dem Griechischen (1782), a translation of the works of Sophocles (1787) Die weisse Frau (1814) and of a poem in seven ballads, which last attained considerable popularity.

Stolberg was married to Louise Stolberg. He died in Windeby.

Notes

 

1748 births
1821 deaths
Writers from Hamburg
Christian
Christian
German male poets
18th-century German poets
19th-century German poets
19th-century German male writers
18th-century German male writers